The men's basketball tournament at the 1967 Pan American Games was held from July 24 to August 2, 1967 in Winnipeg, Manitoba, Canada.

Men's competition

Participating nations

Preliminary round

Final round

Final ranking

Medalists

Awards

Women's competition

Participating nations

Final ranking

Awards

References
 Results
 basketpedya

1967
Basketball
1967–68 in South American basketball
1967–68 in North American basketball
International basketball competitions hosted by Canada